Tor Bay is a small fishing community in the Canadian province of Nova Scotia, located in the Municipality of the District of Guysborough in Guysborough County. It is located at the south-western end of a bay of the same name.

History
In the 1830s fishing vessels of between 40 and 120 tons were being built here.

References

Communities in Guysborough County, Nova Scotia
General Service Areas in Nova Scotia